Jastun Shah Rural District is a rural district (dehestan) in Hati District, Lali County, Khuzestan Province, Iran. At the 2006 census, its population was 3,272, in 640 families.  The rural district has 37 villages.

References 

Rural Districts of Khuzestan Province
Lali County